Earl Mark Sean Stein (born 29 January 1966) is a South African former professional footballer and physiotherapist.

As a player, he was a striker from 1984 until 2004, notably in the Premier League for Chelsea and the Football League for Luton Town, Aldershot, Queens Park Rangers, Oxford United, Stoke City, Ipswich Town and AFC Bournemouth before finishing his career in Non-league with Dagenham & Redbridge and Waltham Forest.

Following his retirement, Stein became a sports physiotherapist and has held the role of first team physio at Barnet, Crawley Town and Rotherham United.

Playing career
Stein was born in Cape Town and moved with his family to London in the 1970s. Both his brothers Brian and Edwin plus Mark decided to become professional footballers, Mark joining Luton Town in 1983. He turned professional in January 1984 and earned three caps with the England under-19 team but he was unable to live up to the heights expected of him at Kenilworth Road and had a short loan spell at Aldershot. In 1987–88, he helped Luton win their first – and only to date – major trophy as they achieved a shock 3–2 over Arsenal in the Football League Cup final, with Stein coming on as a substitute in the final.

In June 1988 he moved on to Queens Park Rangers where he spent the 1988–89 season scoring seven goals in 42 appearances. He signed for Oxford United in September 1989 after failing out of favour at Loftus Road. After two seasons with Oxford Stein found himself out of the side and playing in the reserves. He joined Stoke City on loan in September 1991 and played five matches without scoring. But he impressed manager Lou Macari with his contribution so much that he persuaded the board to pay £100,000 for his services. It proved to be a sound piece of business as Stein went on a fine run, scoring 22 goals in 1991–92 helping Stoke reach the play-offs where they lost to Stockport County although they did beat County in the 1992 Football League Trophy Final with Stein scoring the game's only goal. Stoke fans named Stein "The Golden One" and he went on to top-score in 1992–93 as Stoke won the Second Division title, Stein scoring 33 goals in 57 matches. In 1993–94 Stein hit the headlines after scoring twice past Manchester United in the League Cup. After Macari moved to Celtic Stein also left the Victoria Ground moving to Premier League Chelsea for a fee of £1.5 million.

Whilst at Chelsea, Stein set a Premier League record by scoring in seven consecutive matches from December 1993 to February 1994. The record stood until 2002, when Ruud van Nistelrooy surpassed it. Stein also played in the 1994 FA Cup Final and, in total, he scored 25 goals in 63 games for the West London club, but by the 1996–97 season had lost his place in the first team due to the arrival of new strikers Mark Hughes, Gianluca Vialli and Gianfranco Zola. He returned to Stoke on a short-term loan, scoring four goals in 11 games in 1996–97, the club's final season at the Victoria Ground. He finally left Chelsea in the summer of 1998 when he signed for AFC Bournemouth after a loan spell.

His spell at Dagenham & Redbridge, in the Conference from 2001 to 2003, was notable for its ending, as Stein resigned over the club's refusal to investigate allegations of racist comments made by Daggers manager Garry Hill against Fitzroy Simpson. Mark cited his father's work as a South African anti-apartheid activist as inspiration for this; "My Dad was a political activist who fought against racism in South Africa all his life. So why should I have to put up with it here?" Stein ended his career playing for Isthmian League Division One North club Waltham Forest, scoring three goals in seven appearances in the 2003–04 season.

Physiotherapist
On 28 June 2007 he was appointed as the new physiotherapist at Barnet after taking on a temporary role at the end of the 2006–07 season. On 22 September 2010, he took up a full-time role as physiotherapist at Crawley Town.

Personal life
He is the younger brother of former Luton Town striker Brian Stein; another brother, Ed Stein, played for Barnet. The Stein brothers were born in South Africa, and arrived in the United Kingdom in 1968 when their father Isaiah Stein, an activist with the African National Congress and former boxer, fled the country to escape police persecution and torture for his political activities. Isaiah continued his activism in Britain, serving as a member of the South African Non-Racial Olympic Committee. On 12 July 2008 he played for the England XI in the Gordon Banks Charity Match at the Britannia Stadium.

Career statistics

Honours
Luton Town
 Football League Cup: 1987–88

Stoke City
 Football League Second Division: 1992–93
 Football League Trophy: 1991–92

Individual
 Second Division PFA Team of the Year: 1992–93, 1998–99
 Stoke City Player of the Year: 1992–93
 National League top scorer: 2001–02
 Stoke City Greatest All-Time XI

References

External links
 Profile at www.sporting-heroes.net
 

1966 births
Living people
AFC Bournemouth players
Chelsea F.C. players
Ipswich Town F.C. players
Luton Town F.C. players
Oxford United F.C. players
Queens Park Rangers F.C. players
Stoke City F.C. players
Dagenham & Redbridge F.C. players
Aldershot F.C. players
Premier League players
English Football League players
English footballers
Association football forwards
Association football physiotherapists
Barnet F.C. non-playing staff
National League (English football) players
FA Cup Final players